Riva Palacio is one of the 67 municipalities of Chihuahua, in northern Mexico. The municipal seat lies at San Andrés. Riva Palacio has an area of 808.97 km².

The municipality had 155 localities, none of which had a population over 1,000.

The municipality's name is in honour of Vicente Riva Palacio.

Geography

Towns and villages
Riva Palacio has 98 localities. The largest are:

References

Municipalities of Chihuahua (state)